Thulappally is a small village in Perunad panchayath of Ranni tehsil in Pathanamthitta district of Kerala state, India.

Etymology 
It is believed that in ancient times there were many small churches in the forest regions including Nilakkal and Thulappally as a result by the visit of St. Thomas in 52 AD. Places like Thulappally and Plappally in the forest were named after these churches. The head church of all these churches were known as Thalappally (Thala means head and pally means church) and which in course of time became "Thulappally".

Geography 
The place is located near to the sacred forest regions (Poongavanam) of Sabarimala with comparatively less population. River Pamba flows westwards through the northern part of Thulappally.

Pilgrim centers

Hindu temple
Vaikundapuram Sri Krishna Swami Temple, a Hindu shrine located on the banks of Pamba River with Lord Krishna as the principal deity is the main temple at Thulappally. The annual festival is hosted from 10 May.

Church

St. Thomas Mar Thoma Syrian Church, this is one of the oldest church in the area which belongs to the Syrian Christians. The church is established in the name of Mar Thoma Sleeha, to show as the reference to the Saint and the heritage of the church.

Mar Thoma Sleeha Syro-Malabar Catholic Church, a newly built church of the Catholics, where the old church was dedicated in the name of St George. This is a pilgrimage church located here under the Syro-Malabar Catholic Eparchy of Kanjirappally.

Sharon Fellowship Church, Thulappally is a Pentecostal Church.

India Pentecostal Church of God, Thulappally
Assemblies of God in India, Thulappally

Masjid
Hidhaythul Islam Juma Masjid, a Muslim Masjid located at Aithalappally on the way to Moolakkayam which is 1KM away from Thulappally Town.

Economy
Majority of people depends upon the agricultural sector. Rubber is being cultivated widely and many rubber plantations are widespread in the populated regions. The hilly terrains here are suitable for its cultivation. Moreover, pepper, banana etc., are also cultivated. Many people works in abroad as well as in urban areas. The 'Malanadu development society' under Kanjirappally diocese has a rural electrification system named "Malanadu Mycro Hydel Power Project" (MHPP) at Thulappally. This small scale power project generates electricity from water bodies and supplies to about 250 families, shops and pilgrim centers.

Climate

A tropical climate is normally experienced here. The place receives significant rainfalls during the monsoon, with a short dry season. The average annual temperature rises to 27.3 °C. The months of June, July and August receives sufficient amount of rainfall, while the temperature falls to 21.7 °C in the month of January. Humidity normally increases in the months of March and April. The presence of thick forests helps to develop local thundershowers.

Nearby schools and colleges
 Government Tribal HSS, Kissumam
ST. George's LPS, Thulappally
ST. Mary's School, Anglevalley
 San Thome HSS, Kanamala
 Caarmel College of Engineering, Koonamkara, Perunad
 Muslim Educational Society (MES) College, Erumely
 Sree Narayana Arts and Science College, Chittar

Nearby hospitals
 Government Ayurveda Hospital, Thulappally
 St. Thomas Hospital, Thulappally
 Assisi Hospital, Mukkoottuthara
 Government Primary Health Centre, Nilakkal
 Govt P.H.C Chithanya Hospital, Angamoozhy

Transport facilities 
There are well connected state highways and rural roads which makes transportation more flexible. Neriyamangalam - Pamba state highway (SH-44), one among the important roads to Sabarimala passes through Thulappally. Both state-owned (KSRTC) and privately operated buses provides service to Thulappally from places like Kottayam, Erumely and Kanjirappally. At times of Sabarimala pilgrimage (Mandala-Makaravilakku), thousands of vehicles passes through the place. In the past, the regions including Thulappally was not so easily accessible due to the absence of quality roads. But the transportation facilities improved when the Kanamala- Elavumkal highway was inaugurated.

Airports
A heliport is situated in Perunad which operates at times of Sabarimala pilgrimage.

Railways
Chengannur (59 km) Thiruvalla (63 km), Kottayam (65 km) and Changanassery (61 km) are the nearby railway stations.

Nearby places 
 Kanamala
 Plappally
 Angel Valley
 Vattappara
 Moolakkayam
 Anglevalley
 Naranamthodu
 Nellimala
 Mandhiram Padi
 Aarattukayam
 Aithalappady

See also
Nilakkal
Thomas the Apostle

References

Villages in Pathanamthitta district